is the tenth studio album by Japanese pop band Pizzicato Five. The album was released on June 21, 1997, by Readymade Records. In the United States, it was released by Matador Records on September 9, 1997, and peaked at number 32 on Billboards Heatseekers Albums chart. A companion remix album, Happy End of You, was released in 1998. Happy End of the World was reissued by Readymade on March 31, 2006.

Composition
On Happy End of the World, Pizzicato Five incorporated influences from contemporary styles of electronic music, including breakbeat, downtempo and drum and bass, into their trademark Shibuya-kei sound. Tokyo Weekender writer Ed Cunningham found that the album saw the band expanding on the "beat-driven experimentation" that had been hinted at on previous albums such as Sweet Pizzicato Five (1992) and Bossa Nova 2001 (1993). He describes it as having "both the density and adventurousness of a plunderphonics record (despite much of it being performed live) and the chilled, featherweight listenability of lounge and easy-listening pop."

Critical reception

Matt Diehl of Entertainment Weekly wrote, "Japan's favorite avant-lounge duo, Pizzicato Five, returns with a more club-oriented set, but their blend of '60s kitsch and savvy pop-culture references remains intact in Happy End of the World, giving the Cardigans a run for the retro-hip money." Stephen Thompson of The A.V. Club said, "It's an excellent addition to the duo's expansive canon, and a must for any pop fan who thinks mainstream dance music can and must be better than the 'Barbie Girl' drivel that populates Top 40 radio playlists."

Stephen Thomas Erlewine of AllMusic said, "It's a surprisingly laid-back album, but that's not necessarily a bad thing – the lush arrangements have an engaging, low-key charm, and the beats are nice and subtle." He added, "Happy End of the World runs a little too long, and no song stands out as a single, but it's an engaging record that suggests there may be more to the Pizzicato Five than kitsch."

In 2007, Rolling Stone Japan placed Happy End of the World at number 64 on its list of the "100 Greatest Japanese Rock Albums of All Time".

Track listing

Notes
 "Porno 3003" is divided into the segments , "Galaxy One" and "It's All Too Beautiful".

Charts

References

External links
 

1997 albums
Pizzicato Five albums
Nippon Columbia albums
Matador Records albums
Japanese-language albums